The Heat may refer to:

The Heat (film), a 2013 film with Sandra Bullock and Melissa McCarthy
The Heat (Toni Braxton album), a 2000 album by Toni Braxton
The Heat (Jesse Malin album), a 2004 album by Jesse Malin
The Heat (Needtobreathe album), a 2007 album by Needtobreathe
, a 1991 album by Dan Reed Network
The Heat, an episode of the cartoon The New Adventures of He-Man
The Heat (Sirius XM), Sirius XM Radio's Urban Contemporary channel
The Miami Heat, a National Basketball Association team
The Heat with Mark McEwan, a reality TV series
Denis Ovens, nicknamed The Heat, English darts player

See also
Heat (disambiguation)